Izé is a commune in the arrondissement of Mayenne, Mayenne department, Pays de la Loire, France.

The Izé hall and mairie border a large fishing pond stocked with salmon and trout. The village has its own bakery  and bar-cafe, which also sells basic food supplies.

The  was heavily rebuilt following the tornado of 1978. Renovation works include new stained glass windows incorporating the faces of contemporary political figures, notably François Mitterrand.

In 2018 the French national statistics bureau, Insee, reported that the population of Izé was 457, down from 2,025 in 1836.

The novelist and critic  (1889-1949) was born in Ize on the 7 May 1889. A plaque marks his house today.

See also
Communes of the Mayenne department

References

Communes of Mayenne